Senator Hendren may refer to:

Jim Hendren (born 1963), Arkansas State Senate
Kim Hendren (born 1938), Arkansas State Senate